ACP-131 is the controlling publication for the listing of Q codes and Z codes. It is published by the Combined Communications Electronics Board (CCEB) countries (Australia, New Zealand, Canada, United Kingdom and United States), and revised from time to time. When the meanings of the codes contained in ACP-131 are translated into various languages, the codes provide a means of communicating between ships of various nations, such as during a NATO exercise, when a common language is not in effect.

History 

The original edition of ACP-131 was published by the U.S. military during the early years of radio telegraphy for use by radio operators using Morse Code on continuous wave (CW) telegraphy. It became especially useful, and even essential, to wireless radio operators on both military and civilian ships at sea before the development of advanced single-sideband telephony in the 1960s.

Reason for the codes 

Radio communications, prior to the advent of landlines and satellites as communication paths and relays, was always subject to unpredictable fade outs caused by weather conditions, practical limits on available emission power at the transmitter, radio frequency of the transmission, type of emission, type of transmitting antenna, signal waveform characteristics, modulation scheme in use, sensitivity of the receiver and presence, or lack of presence, of atmospheric reflective layers above the earth, such as the E-layer and F-layers, the type of receiving antenna, the time of day, and numerous other factors.

Because of these factors which often resulted in limiting periods of transmission time on certain frequencies to only several hours a day, or only several minutes, it was found necessary to keep each wireless transmission as short as possible and to still get the message through. This was particularly true of CW radio circuits shared by a number of operators, with some waiting their turn to transmit.

As a result, an operator communicating by CW radio to another operator, wanting to know how the other operator was receiving the signal, could send out a message on his key in Morse Code stating, "How are you receiving me?"

Using ACP-131 codes, the question could be phrased simply "INT QRK"

resulting in much more efficient use of circuit time.

If the receiver hears the sender in a "loud and clear" condition, the response would be "QRK 5":

All of which requires less circuit time and less "pounding" on the key by the sending operators.

Should the receiving operator not understand the sending operator, the receiving operator would send "?"

The other operator would respond again with:

which is much easier than retransmitting "How are you receiving me?"

If the receiving operator understood the sending operator, the receiving operator would send "ROGER", or the short form "R"

"R" and "?" are similarly structured, but very easy to distinguish.

Applicability of the codes 

According to ACP-125(F), paragraphs 103 and 104, in radio communications involving Allied military units:
 Q codes are authorized for both civilian and military use, and for communications between the two.
 Z codes are authorized for use only among military stations.

Applicability of codes by type of emission 

 Civilian radio continuous wave (CW): Q codes.
 Military radio continuous wave (CW): Q codes and Z codes.
 Civilian shipboard signal lamp: Q codes.
 Military shipboard signal lamp: Q codes and Z codes.
 Military Flag semaphore: Q codes and Z codes. 
 Military teletype: Z codes used as routers in message header.

Voice transmission 

Some assert that the use of Q codes and Z codes was not intended for use on voice circuits, where plain language was speedy and easily recognizable, especially when employing the character recognition system in use at the time, such as ALPHA, BRAVO, CHARLIE, etc. However, in military communication the latter are still in use. The latter due to the poor transfer-conditions still suffered on HF band communications (eg, due to heavy swells or Northern Light), ie, for which Q codes and Z codes remain in use. To exemplify the latter, while words such as "received one flash message" may be distorted into unrecognisable clutter, Z codes exhibits a distinctiveness (which enables transfer of radio-messages even under poor conditions).

Typical Simplex military voice exchange:

 Q. Lima Five this is Charlie Two – Radio Check Over.
 A. Lima Five - roger, over.
 A. Charlie Two - roger, out.
However, some voice operators, such as amateur radio operators, find it convenient or traditional to use some of the Q codes, such as QSL, QRK, etc.

See also 

 Q code
 Z code
 Morse code
 Continuous wave
 Radio
 500 kHz

References

External links 

 ACP 131(F) - Communications Instructions Operating Signals, April 2009
 Army Regulation 310-50 - Authorized Abbreviations, Brevity Codes, and Acronyms
 

Brevity codes
Military standardization
Military publications
Military radio systems
Amateur radio
Encodings
Maritime communication
History of radio